Sudoměřice u Bechyně is a municipality and village in Tábor District in the South Bohemian Region of the Czech Republic. It has about 800 inhabitants.

Administrative parts
Villages of Bechyňská Smoleč and Bežerovice are administrative parts of Sudoměřice u Bechyně.

References

Villages in Tábor District